Strömbadet, officially Stockholms Bad- och Siminrättning i Norrström, was the first large cold bathhouse in Stockholm, located in Norrström, just north of Riddarholmen. It was opened in 1884 and was made entirely of wood in neo-renaissance style designed by the architect brothers Axel Kumlien and Hjalmar Kumlien.

Pictures

References

External links

Stockholm city archival images
Stockholm city archival video

Buildings and structures in Stockholm